Pizzazz is the fifth album by American singer Patrice Rushen.

Reception

While she was attacked for leaving the jazz genre, Rushen was able to get a good fan base with an R&B/Pop audience. Rushen's profile in the R&B world continued to increase with Pizzazz, her second album for Elektra Records and fifth overall.

Pizzazz was her second highest-charting album, reaching #39 in 1979. It features the hit single "Haven't You Heard." The single soared to the top of R&B radio playlists and is among Rushen's biggest hits.

With this album Rushen drew on such influences as Earth, Wind & Fire, Minnie Riperton, Stevie Wonder, and The Emotions. Rushen was able get the R&B lover's attention with songs such as the funky opener "Let the Music Take Me," the soulful ballad "Settle for My Love," and the perky "Keepin' Faith in Love." Pizzazz received plenty of attacks from jazz critics, who accused Rushen of being a traitor, but from an R&B/Pop perspective the album is considered one of Rushen's most rewarding and essential albums.

Track listing

Personnel 
 Patrice Rushen – lead vocals (1, 2, 3, 5, 6, 7), backing vocals (1-7), electric piano (1, 2, 3, 5, 6, 7), synth solo (1), percussion (1, 3, 5, 6, 7), acoustic piano (2, 4, 5, 7, 8), drums (3, 6), tambourine (4, 8), clavinet (6); horn, string and vocal arrangements 
 Paul Jackson Jr. – guitar (1, 4, 8)
 Marlo Henderson – guitar (1, 2, 7)
 Al McKay – guitar (2)
 Wah Wah Watson – guitar (4, 6, 8), backing vocals (6)
 Wali Ali – guitar (5, 7)
 Freddie Washington – bass (1-8), acoustic guitar (3), drums (6), percussion (6)
 Leon "Ndugu" Chancler – drums (1, 4, 8)
 James Gadson – drums (2)
 Melvin Webb – congas (1), drums (5, 7)
 Bill Summers – percussion (2)
 Lynn Davis – backing vocals (1, 3-8)
 Roy Galloway – backing vocals (1, 3, 6, 7)
 Josie James – backing vocals (1, 4, 5, 7, 8)
 Pauline Wilson – backing vocals (2)
 Syreeta Wright – backing vocals (2)
 Jim Gilstrap – backing vocals (4, 6, 8)
 D. J. Rogers – lead vocals (6)

Handclaps
 Tony Lewis 
 Charles Mims Jr.
 Phil Moores
 Chip Orlando
 Larry Robinson
 Patrice Rushen
 Freddie Washington

Horns / Horn Contractors 
 Gerald Albright – reeds 
 William Green – reeds
 Clay Lawrey – trombone, baritone
 Maurice Spears – bass trombone
 Oscar Brashear – trumpet, flugelhorn 
 Raymond Lee Brown – trumpet, flugelhorn

Strings
 Charles Veal Jr. – concertmaster (1, 3-8)
 Gerald Vinci – concertmaster (2)
 Rosemary McLean – contractor 
 Marilyn Baker, Harry Bluestone, Ronald Cooper, Endre Granat, William Henderson, Carl LaMagna, Robert Lipsett, Nils Oliver, Jerome Reisler, Art Royval, Terudo Shoenbrun, Robert Sushell, Barbara Thomason, Charles Veal Jr. and Kenneth Yerke – string performers

Production 
 Patrice Rushen – producer, executive producer 
 Reggie Andrews – producer
 Charles Mims Jr. – producer 
 Peter Chaikin – engineer 
 Chris Gordon – assistant engineer 
 Phil Moores – assistant engineer 
 Chip Orlando – assistant engineer 
 F. Byron Clark – remixing 
 Chris Bellman – mastering 
 Allen Zentz Mastering (San Clemente, California) – mastering location 
 Ron Coro – art direction, design 
 Norman Seeff – front cover and sleeve photography 
 Moshe Brakha – back cover photography

Charts

Singles

References

External links

 Patrice Rushen-Pizzazz at Discogs

1979 albums
Patrice Rushen albums
Elektra Records albums